Effervescing (foaled 1973 in Kentucky) is an American Thoroughbred racehorse. Effervescing was a stakes winner at the age 3, 4 and 5 he was one of the first successful trainees by D. Wayne Lukas.

Background
Bred by Ogden Phipps, Effervescing was a son of the French sire Le Fabuleux whose other significant progeny included American multiple Grade I winner, The Bart and Dauphin Fabuleux, the 1984 Canadian Horse of the Year. He was out of the American mare, Sparkling whose U.S. Racing Hall of Fame sire Bold Ruler was an inductee and the Leading sire in North America eight times.

Racing career
At the age of three and going off at long shot odds of 24-1 he won the $112,500 Man O' War Stakes on Belmont Park's turf course October 11, 1976 

At age four, he won at Saratoga Race Course the turf-run Sword Dancer Handicap with future Hall of Fame jockey Ángel Cordero Jr. up

At the age of five Effervescing won two $100,000+ purse stakes races within one week. He was victorious in both the $110,500 American Handicap, a Grade 2 race on turf by 3-lengths  and then the Citation Handicap on dirt, both at Hollywood Park in 1978 on July 4 and July 10 respectively. Laffit Pincay Jr. was the jockey for both efforts.

According to Lukas' autobiography "D. Wayne", Albert Yank, one of the owners, after the American Handicap victory wanted to run the horse in a stakes race in Chicago later in the fall. When Lukas said he wanted to run the horse back again in five days the reply was Are you drinking your own bathwater?. Albert Yank gave in after Lukas held his ground.

Effervescing won the Eddie Read Handicap (a turf race at 9 furlongs) at Del Mar Racetrack also in 1978 with Laffit his rider again.

Stud record
Effervescing stood at Ashford Stud in Kentucky. He is the sire of two Champions and sixteen stakes winners, with earnings of 4,674,623

References
 DeVito, Carlo. D. Wayne : The High-Rolling and Fast Times of America's Premier Horse Trainer (2002) McGraw-Hill 

1973 racehorse births
Racehorses bred in Kentucky
Racehorses trained in the United States
Thoroughbred family 1-x